Roads in Portugal are defined by the Plano Rodoviário Nacional (PRN), which describes the existing and planned network of Portuguese roads. The present plan in force is the 2000 National Road Plan (PRN 2000), approved in 1998. It replaced PRN 1985, which itself had replaced PRN 1945.

The Portuguese road infrastructure was considered the best in Europe and the second best in the world by the World Economic Forum in its Global Competitiveness Report for 2014–2015. In the 2017–2018 report, it was considered to 8th best in the world. Nevertheless, all of these data were obtained through nothing more than an opinion survey of selected business executives.

The scenic road between Peso da Régua and Pinhão, in Trás-os-Montes region, was considered the world's best driving road, according to the Avis Driving Index. This road is a section of the N 222 which follows the Douro Valley.

History of road classification in Portugal

First road plans 

The first road plans in Portugal date back from 1843 and 1848, and were based on 18th century plans which prioritized connections between Lisbon and strategic points of the country, and as a support for fluvial routes. The planned network was classified in 1850 into estradas (roads) and caminhos (paths), with the estradas being classified as 1st and 2nd class. Caminhos were routes of merely local interest.

In 1862, the existing and planned roads were classified as 1st class roads or estradas reais (royal roads), 2nd class roads or estradas distritais (district roads), and estradas municipais (municipal roads). The estradas reais were those with direct or indirect (via railways, for instance) origin in Lisbon and were managed by the State. The estradas distritais were managed by the districts while estradas municipais were managed by the municipalities.

With the abolition of the monarchy in 1910, the estradas reais were renamed estradas nacionais (national roads).

In 1913, the Law of 22 February established a commission to study a new classification of the roads and propose guidelines to establish that classification. However, despite these efforts, many routes were not clearly classified and the condition of most roads was chaotic. Widespread use of the automobile in the 1920s created new pressure for reforming the Portuguese road network.

In 1926, under the Ditadura Nacional regime, a provisional General Plan of National Roads of 1st and 2nd class was established by Decree  12,100 of 31 July 1926, according to what was previewed by the Law of 22 February 1913. Both the 1st and 2nd class roads would be designated estradas nacionais, with the term estrada distrital disappearing. They were designated EN xx-x (for estradas nacionais followed by the number of the road and its class). This plan established 23 roads of 1st class (designated EN 1-1ª to EN 23-1ª) and 112 roads of 2nd class (designated EN 1-2ª to EN 112-2ª). The definite General Plan of National Roads was approved by Decree No. 16,075 of 30 September 1928. It kept the 23 1st class roads and the 112 2nd class ones, but some roads were rerouted, extended, or truncated.

The 1st class national roads included in the 1928 General Plan of National Roads were the following:

By Law No. 3,969 of 20 July 1927, the Junta Autónoma das Estradas (JAE) was created to study the condition of the Portuguese road network.

In 1933, roads were reclassified as estradas nacionais (1st and 2nd class), estradas municipais and caminhos públicos (public paths), with the latter two under municipal management.

1945 National Road Plan 

In 1933, the entire (i.e. built and planned) network of national roads totalled . The state recognized the importance of the road network and, in 1945, created the first real national road plan, the Plano Rodoviário Nacional de 1945 (PRN 45), defined in Law No. 34,593 of 11 May 1945.

PRN 1945 classified the national road network in Rede Fundamental (Fundamental Network) and Rede Complementar (Complementary Network). The latter served to support the fundamental network. Roads were classified according to the following:

 Fundamental Network: Estradas nacionais (EN or N)
 1st-class roads:
 Principal routes (itinerários principais):  to 
 Other first-class roads:  to 
 2nd-class roads:
  to 
 Complementary Network: Estradas nacionais (EN or N)
 3rd-class roads:
  to 
 . There were 438 branch roads.

The National Roads Statutes were subsequently approved in 1949.

In 1961, separate legislation (Law No. 2110 of 19 August 1961) on municipal roads defined new guidelines on construction, maintenance, and commercialization of these roads, and those were classified as following:

 Estradas municipais (EM or M):
 –, following a district sequence, so the sequence 501 and over was repeated in every district. Municipal Roads could have also Branch Roads, following the same rules as for National Roads
 Caminhos públicos or, from 1961, caminhos municipais (CM) 
  and on, with the same numbering rules as Municipal Roads
 	
The Main Roads could be, by law, upgraded to 4 lanes with central separation, if necessary. In fact this happened before PRN 1945, with the N7 motorway (now the A5) between Lisbon and the National Stadium completed in 1944, and in 1961 with the first  of N1 motorway (now A1) between Lisbon and Vila Franca de Xira. The first urban highways were built in the 1960s. Nevertheless, most motorways built before 1985 had no number at all.

The road classes were distinguished using colour codes: red for first class, blue for second class, green for thirrd class, yellow for municipal roads, and brown for municipal paths. These colours were applied as the basis of the location markers and occasionally in the background of the road numbers. The numbering distribution for main roads was according to the importance of its route in the network, and for N101 and over were numbered in a north-to-south fashion.

According to PRN 1945, there were 18 Main Roads, designated N1 through N18.

{| class="wikitable" style="margin:0.5em 0.5em 0.5em 1em; padding:0.5em; font-size:95%;"
|-
! Number
! Route
! Length
! Notes
|-
Originally crossing the towns or city centres on its route, over the years many bypass roads have been built to avoid urban traffic.

In 1961, the new motorway section between Lisbon and Vila Franca de Xira, part of the future Lisbon–Oporto Motorway, was integrated into the N1. The original route became an extension of the N10. The N1 classification for the referred branch of A1 had been kept until 1985, thereafter the N1 road had its starting point at the level of km 26.

Also during the 1960s, a more direct and straight connection between Venda das Raparigas (Benedita, Alcobaça) and São Jorge (Porto de Mós) has been built. The original route was reclassified, in 1973, as N 8–6 (Venda das Raparigas–Alcobaça, or more properly Alcobaça–Venda das Raparigas) and N 8 (Alcobaça–vicinity of São Jorge), thus extending its route farther north.

According to PRN 1985, most parts of this road have been included on IC2, signed as IC2/N1. Some sections which aren't common with IC2 are intended for local traffic, or are parts parallel to auto-estrada sections of IC2.
|-
|  || Chaves – Vila Real – Viseu – Penacova – Abrantes – Ponte de Sor – Montemor-o-Novo – Ferreira do Alentejo – Almodôvar – Faro ||  ||The longest road of Portugal according to 1945 National Roadway Plan, connecting north to south, "cutting" the country halfway between west and east and crossing eleven of the eighteen districts of Portugal. In Trás-os-Montes and Viseu district N2 crossed district capitals (Vila Real and Viseu) and medium-sized cities (Chaves and Lamego) but south of that regions (i.e. roughly for the remaining 500 km), the road ran far from any major city until near its end in Faro. N2 never had an autonomous traffic that justified its importance in the 1945 Plan and the long national road became a sequential collection of regional sections. The failure of N2 proved that the major link between the Northern and Southern regions of Portugal should always cross Lisbon area (as happens nowadays with IP1 and IC1). In the 1985 and 2000 National Road Plans, IP3 (a single- or dual-carriageway highway) runs parallel to N2 in Trás-os-Montes and Viseu district, but south of that no major road follows the former N2 axis. Currently, almost all sections of N2 have been downgraded to regional or municipal roads.

The route classified as N2 by 1945 had been fully asphalted from the 1930s to 1944.

Many branches had been replaced in importance by the 1985 Plan's IP routes, some renamed as Estrada Regional (R 2), some were municipalized and some classified as historical patrimony.

Due to its characteristics, N2 is nicknamed Portuguese Route 66.

In November 2015, a trans-regional project called Rota da Estrada Nacional 2 had been signed by eleven of the thirty-six municipalities along its route (although all municipalities will be part of the project). It aims to promote the past part of Portugal's inland crossed by the road for its importance to tourism, culture and gastronomy.|-
|  || Carregado (N1) – Santarém – Torres Novas – Vila Velha de Rodão – Castelo Branco (N18) ||  || It was the most direct connection between Lisbon (Carregado is located at km 33 of N 1) and the most important cities of the former provinces of Ribatejo, Beira Baixa, and Beira Alta, the latter through N18, which this road meets in Sernadas do Ródão.
|-
|  || Montijo – Vendas Novas – Estremoz – Elvas – Caia || ; projected || The original project of this road included a bridge over the Tagus River, in order to directly connect Lisbon with Alentejo and the border of Caia, near Badajoz, where it would meet the Spanish N-V. 
The bridge was never built and this road starts at the level of km 12.
|-
|  || Montijo – Marateca – Alcácer do Sal – Barragem do Vale de Gaio – N2 ||  || Projected to connect the Lisbon region into the south of Portugal, through N2, which this road would meet in Torrão; later it was decided that this road would run through Vale do Gaio Dam. 
The connection between Vale do Gaio Dam and N2 was never built, but the route through Torrão was built and reclassified as N5-2.
|-
|  || Lisbon – Paço de Arcos – Parede – Estoril – Cascais ||  || The famous seaside Road of Cascais/Estoril Coast, also known as Avenida Marginal on most of its route. It is designed as a four lane, two in either direction. This road was projected to include the former Lisbon ringroad on its route.
|-
|  || Lisbon – National Stadium ||  || Original name of the A5, the first Portuguese motorway, inaugurated in 1944. It was only extended into Cascais in 1991 when it became known as A5.
|-
|  || Lisbon – Loures – Torres Vedras – Óbidos – Caldas da Rainha – Alcobaça – Cruz da Légua – IC2 / N1 ||  || Connects Lisbon to the West Region. Originally this road ended in Alcobaça, meeting there N 1 (see N 1 for details). 
|-
|  || Cascais (N6) – Sintra – Torres Vedras – Alenquer (N1) ||  || Crosses the northern region of Lisbon. Along with N 6 (Lisbon–Cascais), N 1 (Alenquer–Vila Franca de Xira), N 10 (Vila Franca de Xira–Lisbon), and the riverside streets of Lisbon, it forms a ring road around the Lisbon region.
|-
|  || Almada – Setúbal – Vila Franca de Xira – Lisbon ||  || A ring road that connects the south bank of Tagus to Lisbon, via Marechal Carmona Bridge (Vila Franca de Xira).

From 1961, it classified the original route of N1 between Vila France de Xira and Lisbon.
|-
|  || Montijo – Barreiro || ; projected || Short-distance road in the south bank of Tagus. The original plan included a connection from Barreiro to Trafaria which was never built.

It was renamed as R11.
|-
|  || Matosinhos – Rio Tinto ||  || Oporto ring road, to be cvted into a boulevard.
|-
|  || Porto – Viana do Castelo – Valença ||  || Road crossing the northwest region of Portugal, with an almost seaside route.

The first  of this road, shared with N14, had been upgraded into a dual carriageway in the 1970s and are known as Via Norte.
|-
|  || Porto – Braga ||  || The first 5 km of this road, shared with N13, had been upgraded into a dual carriageway in the 1970s and are known as Via Norte.
|-
|  || Ermesinde – Amarante – Vila Real – Mirandela – Bragança ||  || The main road from Oporto to the region of Trás-os-Montes e Alto Douro, until the construction of IP4.
|-
|  || Aveiro – Viseu – Guarda – Vilar Formoso ||  || Connects Aveiro to the most-important border with Spain.

From the 1970s, the road was considered obsolete due to several kilometres of congested traffic on the approach to the border. As an alternative IP5 was built between 1983 and 1991, but this road proved to be highly dangerous and was cvted into an autoestrada, also known as A25.
|-
|  || Coimbra – Celorico da Beira (N16) ||  || Connects Coimbra with the Beira Alta region, crossing the outskirts of Serra da Estrela.

Popularly known as Estrada da Beira.
|-
|  || Guarda – Castelo Branco – Portalegre – Estremoz – Évora – Beja – Ourique – Ervidel (N2) ||  || Crosses the most important cities in the far east of Portugal, connects with N 2 in Ervidel.

Many branches were included on IP2.
|}

 1985 National Road Plan 

New sections of motorways were then built in the 1970s and the early 1980s, like the Vila Franca de Xira–Carregado (1977), Carregado–Aveiras de Cima (1980), Condeixa-a-Nova–Mealhada (1982, which permitted bypassing the city centre of Coimbra), Santa Maria da Feira–Carvalhos (1980) and Albergaria-a-Velha–Santa Maria da Feira (1983) sections; these would become part of the A1 motorway and the extension of the A2 motorway into Setúbal (between 1978 and 1979).

However, the whole road network was seen to be increasingly inadequate to properly serving the whole country. While Portugal was preparing to enter the EEC, the replacement for PRN 1945 was created by the Law 380/85 of 25 September 1985, the Plano Rodoviário Nacional de 1985 or PRN 1985.

The road network would again comprise the Rede Fundamental, composed of nine itinerários principais (principal routes), designated IP1 through IP9, which totalized .

The non-motorway sections of the itinerários principais started to be identified with green background direction signs and green background IPx road numbers. In the late 1990s, although the background of the direction signs continued to be green, the IPx road numbers started to be put on red background rectangles.

The itinerários principais was set to be of restricted access, forbidding pedestrian, animal, and bicycle traffic, but exceptions could be accepted, especially for sections resulting from the reclassification of former national roads into IP network.

Such a classification was proposed before the publication of PRN 1985. In the early 1980s, the first branches of the future IP routes were built. These were a  loop road alternative to N16 between Mangualde and Prime (Viseu) for IP5 route, built in 1983, and another branch built in 1981 that was integrated on the N2 route but later became part of IP3, between Oliveira do Mondego and Chamadouro when Aguieira Dam was built.

The road network also included the Rede Complementar (Complementary Network) of 24 itinerários complementares (IC) and other roads. The "other roads" were the former PRN 1945 national roads not set to be transformed into IP or IC, neither set for declassification from the national road network. In practice, the "other roads" continued to be signed as estradas nacionais (N or EN).

The non-motorway roads of the Rede Complementar were signed with white background direction signs.

The PRN 1985 established 24 itinerários complementares, designated IC1 through IC24, which totalled :

As the PRN 1985 focused mainly on new roads to be built, no clear rules were established for a procedure regarding the old roads that were to be declassified. In practice, most of them continued to be managed by the national road agency, JAE, and continued to be designated estradas nacionais. Some of them were transferred to the management of local municipalities.

Until the early 1980s, the Portuguese motorways did not have a proper number, each being referred to by a name (with some sections that were part of an estrada nacional also using the respective Nxx number). The existing motorways at that time (all of them managed under concession) started to receive proper numbers of the type Axx. With the application of the PRN 1985, new motorways were built with a few of them being managed directly by JAE and not under concession like the majority. So, although all motorways were part of an IP or IC, only concessionated ones received the Axx number (whether tolled or not). This number was signalized and the IPxx or ICxx number was disused in the motorway signage. The other motorways – non-concessionated, and therefore, always non-tolled – were signalized with the IPxx or ICxx number. Until the 2000s, almost all motorways under concession were tolled, so during that period, a signed Axx number helped drivers know in advance whether a motorway was tolled.

All motorways were signed with blue background direction signs, independently of being part of the Rede Fundamental or the Rede Complementar.

 2000 National Road Plan 

In spite of its name, Plano Rodoviário Nacional de 2000 or PRN 2000 was approved in 1998 and was published by Law No. 222/98 of 17 July 1998. The plan includes  of roads.

The so-called "other roads" of the PRN 1985 disappeared from the PRN 2000, with the designation estradas nacionais becoming official again. A new kind of road, the estradas regionais (regional roads) was also introduced.

The Road Network is defined as following:

Fundamental Network:
Itinerários principais 
Complementary Network:
Itinerários complementares 
Estradas nacionais 
Regional Network:
Estradas regionais (sections of former estradas nacionais, which take the same numbering, i.e. ER 2 is a section of EN 2, if the road crosses more than one region, separate sections of the former National Road can be part of the Regional Network) 
Rede Nacional de Autoestradas (National Highway Network)
Autoestradas (always part of IP and IC network)

IP and IC roads may have other designations, especially those integrated with the National Highway Network, where the "A" designation is preferred on traffic signage, except for some city or suburban highways.

Since its approval, the PRN 2000 was updated twice (in 1999 and in 2003).

 Current classification according PRN 2000 

 Motorways 

 is the Portuguese-language word for "motorway" or "freeway." Several autoestradas are linked with the Spanish motorway system and, through Spain, to the rest of Europe.

During the 1990s and early 2000s, Portugal was the country with the greatest development in the motorway network in the European Union.

Although administratively a separate motorway network exists, in practice each autoestrada overlaps part or all of an IP (Itinerário Principal or Main Itinerary) or an IC (Itinerário Complementar or Complementary Itinerary). These are designated with an "A" code as well as an IP or an IC code, though they are typically only signalized by the A designation. In addition, many of these roads are part of the European road network, and so also carry an "E" designation, which may serve as reference for non-Portuguese drivers.

Label:

 – = in use
 –  – = under construction
 – ** – = planned

 Tolls and taxation 
As of 2013, 84% of Portuguese motorways have tolls, although there are also some toll-free highways, mostly in urban areas, like those of Greater Lisbon and Greater Oporto. Tolls charge drivers by the distance they travel. Almost all motorways are managed by private concessionaries, such as Brisa and Ascendi. In the late 1990s and early 2000s, the Government of Portugal created seven shadow toll concessions, the SCUT toll (tolls with no charges for the users). However, due to economical and political reasons, the shadow toll concept was abolished between 2010 and 2011, with electronic toll equipment being installed in these motorways, to charge their users. Having only electronic tolls, former SCUT motorways can now only be used by vehicles equipped with electronic payment devices or vehicles registered in the system. In the 2000s (i.e. previous to the introduction of tolls in SCUT highways), 35% of the Portuguese motorway network was toll-free, and Portugal was already considered one of the European countries with more toll roads. Following the introduction of tolls in former SCUT highways, 84% of the network had tolls, i.e., only 16% was toll-free.

Since 1991 there is an electronic payment system for tolls in Portugal called Via Verde. Under this system, the driver installs a small device on the front windshield that communicates electronically with Brisa (the company responsible for managing most of the motorways in Portugal). Since the payment is electronic, it is quick to enter or leave the motorway, avoiding payment lines (which are still available for drivers without Via Verde). This system has won several prizes for its innovative form of paying for services.

 Principal routes 

There are 9 itinerários principais (principal routes), signalized by the prefix IP, designated IP1 through IP9.

IP1 and IP2 form cross-national north–south routes. The first runs along the west part of the country then ends in the southeast border of Castro Marim/Vila Real de Santo António; the second runs along the east part, roughly along the border with Spain.

All other routes follow a west–east course, with the exception of IP3 which runs mostly north–south.

All itinerários principais, except IP6 and IP9, are connected with the Spanish border. IP2 reaches Spain by route of N103-7, in the region of Trás-os-Montes e Alto Douro.

 Complementary routes 
 

There are 37 itinerários complementares (complementary routes), signalized by the letters IC, designated IC1 through IC37.

Note: Italics and -**- refers to unbuilt sections.

 National routes Estradas Nacionais (national routes) belong to the Complementary Network. They have three main functions: connect cities not linked by an IP or IC highway, connect municipal seats, borders, ports and airports to the rest of the state-owned network and provide free alternatives to toll motorways. Examples for each of these functions can be made: N103 links Braga, Chaves and Braganza, N256 and N256-1 link the border of São Leonardo and the municipal seats of Mourão and Reguengos de Monsaraz to IP2 expressway and N4 provides a free alternative to A6 toll motorway. National roads kept the same numbering they had in the 1945 Plan, with the prefix N, and are administered by the agency Estradas de Portugal. In the 1985 Plan, these were generically referred as "other roads".

Many of the 1945 Plan's estradas nacionais were not included in the post-1985 highway plans and were declassified from the National Road Network in anticipation of their transfer to municipal authorities. Although some were transferred, many municipalities did not assume responsibility for the management of these roads; a number of them continue to be administered by the national roads agency. Despite being declassified, most of the roads retained their designations, keeping their old numberings and N prefixes, including those that are administered by the municipalities.

 Regional roads Estradas regionais (regional roads) integrate the Regional Network. This road class was created in 1998, with the approval of the 2000 National Roadway Plan. According to Law No. 222/98 "the public road communications with supra-municipal interest, and complementary to the National Road Network, are carried by Regional Roads".

Each regional road maintains the number of the national road or municipal road that originated it. Regional roads are represented by the letter R. Because, in 1998, it was rejected in a referendum, a reform which consisted of the creation of eight administrative regions in mainland Portugal, nowadays, some regional roads are administrated by Estradas de Portugal, while others are administrated by Portuguese municipalities.

 Municipal roads Estradas municipais'' (municipal roads) are represented by the letter M and are administrated by Portuguese municipalities. These routes were created in 1961, since which time many branches of national routes had been municipalized. Some municipal routes created by the 1985 Plan were renamed as "national roads" or "regional roads" in the 2000 Plan.

European routes 
Portugal is crossed by eight European routes:

See also
 Estradas de Portugal (agency responsible for administering roads)

External links

References